Jakutidae is an extinct family of trilobite in the order Corynexochida. There are at least four genera and about seven described species in Jakutidae.

Genera
These four genera belong to the family Jakutidae:
 † Bathyuriscellus Lermontova, 1951
 † Jakutus Lermontova, 1951
 † Malykania Suvorova, 1958
 † Prouktaspis Repina, 1965

References

 
Articles created by Qbugbot
Trilobite families